Tyler Layton (born 6 May 1968) is an American actress from Alabama.

Layton's father was a radio announcer (including working as the colour analyst on Alabama Crimson Tide football radio broadcasts) and a sports journalist who encouraged her from an early age. During her years at school, Layton regularly participated in stage productions.

From 1986 - 1991 she studied at the University of Alabama where she achieved a Bachelor of Arts degree. She moved to Chicago and later to Los Angeles where she graduated from the University of California-Irvine with a Master of Fine Arts degree. While studying for her degree she played the role of Maggie in Cat on a Hot Tin Roof and Melinda Warren in Charmed.

Layton became a member of the Oregon Shakespeare Festival company in 2004. Previously, she starred as Detective Holly Rawlins in TV's Silk Stalkings from 1995 - 1996. She is a member of Actors Equity and Screen Actor's Guild.

Theatre work
Rabbit Hole as Izzy
The Merry Wives of Windsor as Mistress Ford
Room Service as Christina Marlow
Love's Labor's Lost as Rosaline
Henry VI as Lady GreyMuch Ado About Nothing as Hero
Noises Off as Brooke Ashton
The Winter's Tale as Perdita
Taming of the Shrew as Bianca
King Lear as Regan
Troilus en Cressida as Cressida
Measure for Measure as Isabella
Stop Kiss as Callie

Layton is currently teaching theatre at St. Edward's University in Austin, TX.

1968 births
Living people
Actresses from Birmingham, Alabama
American stage actresses
American television actresses
University of Alabama alumni
University of California, Irvine alumni
21st-century American women